SS (RMS) Peveril (II) was a steel, single-screw cargo vessel, built by Cammell Laird at Birkenhead in 1929, and operated by the Isle of Man Steam Packet Company until 1964.

Dimensions
Length 205 feet; beam 34 feet 6 inches; depth 16 feet. She was powered by one triple-expansion directly coupled engine which produced 200 p.s.i., developing 1,250 i.h.p. and gave her a speed of 12 knots. Peveril had accommodation for 12 passengers and a crew of 17.

Service life
Peveril was constructed at a cost of £42,600, and was the first cargo ship ordered directly by the Steam Packet, previous ones having been bought second hand. She was launched at Cammel Laird & Co. Ltd, Birkenhead on 25 April 1929 by Mrs. W.H. Kitto. The vessel traded mainly between Douglas, Ramsey and Liverpool.

The Isle of Man was affected by strong southeasterly gales during early March 1937, which in turn affected the Peveril's schedule. Having made passage from Liverpool to Douglas on Wednesday March 10, the Peveril was required to achor at the Double Corner, in the inner harbour of Douglas, on account of the heavy sea. She was unable to discharge her cargo on Thursday March 11, which in turn meant that the Peveril could not carry out her sailing programme as scheduled. She finally resumed her schedule when she left Douglas on Friday March 12.

On Monday 9 October 1961 Peveril's Master Capt. Alex Clucas was found dead on board the vessel whilst she was loading cargo in the Coburg Dock, Liverpool, having arrived from Douglas the previous day.
Capt. Clucas was 56 years of age, and was found by a member of his crew lying in his cabin in an unconscious state. He was taken to hospital, but was pronounced dead on arrival. Capt. Clucas' brother, Capt. Robert Clucas, was at that time Master of the Manxman.

Disposal
With the arrival of her successor, MV Peveril, she became redundant. She had her name changed to Peveril II in October 1963 for the last few months of her life, to release her original name for the new cargo vessel. Peveril II was sold to the Belton Shipping and Trading Company of London, and was broken up at Glasson Dock, Lancaster, in May 1964.

References

Bibliography

 Chappell, Connery (1980). Island Lifeline T. Stephenson & Sons Ltd 

Ships of the Isle of Man Steam Packet Company
1929 ships
Steamships of the United Kingdom